Parashkev Hadjiev (Bulgarian: Парашкев Хаджиев; born in Sofia, Bulgaria, 27 April 1912 - 1992) was a Bulgarian composer. He was the son of conductor Todor Hadjiev, an early champion of Bulgarian opera. Some view Parashkev Hadjiev as perhaps the most important post-war composer in Bulgaria.

Works

Operas
 Once Upon a Time (1957)
 A Madcap (1959) - Libretto Ivan Genov
 Albena (1962) - libretto Peter Filchev (after the drama of Yordan Yovkov)
 Aika-1963   https://www.youtube.com/watch?v=MSv5VWjdc4U
 July Night (1964) - after the drama of Ivan Genov Early ballad Millionaire (1965) - a comedy Yordan Yovkov
 Masters (1966) - a drama of R. Stoyanov
 Golden Apple - (1972)
 Leto 893 (1973) - Libretto Pancho Panchev
 Maria Desislava (1978) - Libretto Kamen Zidarov
 Ioannis Rex (1981) - Libretto Радко Радков / Radko Radkov
 Paradoxes three one-act operas: Divorce, Thief and Gifts (1982)
 I, Claudius (1984)
 Star without name (1985) - Libretto Ognyan Stamboliev
 Malingerer (1987)
 Babinata bread (1989)
 Inspector (1990)
 John Kukuzel Love (1992)

Operetta
 Divided (1952)
 Icahn (1955 d)
 Madame Sans Gene (1958 d)

Film music 
 Marriage, directed by Borozanov B. (1942)
 Fire trail, directed by B. Borozanov, At. Georgiev (1946)
 Kalin eagle, directed by Borozanov B. (1950)
 Traces remain, directed by Peter Vasilev (1956)
 Little, directed by N. Korabov (1958)

Recordings
 Songs of Parashkev Hadjiev (Песните на Парашкев Хаджиев) Ludmila Hadjieva. CD 0717-2  2006.
 On Slavic Arias by Krassimira Stoyanova - aria from Maria Desislava, opera: Scene 4. Velíki bózhe, chuy móyata molbá!''

Honours
Hadzhiev Glacier in Antarctica is named after Parashkev Hadzhiev.

References

Musicians from Sofia
Bulgarian composers
1912 births
1992 deaths
20th-century composers